Lara Oviedo (born 12 April 1988) is an Argentine-Italian field hockey player.

Hockey career
In 2017, Oviedo was called into the Italian senior national women's team. She competed in the team that finished fifth at the 2016–17 Hockey World League Semifinals in Brussels.

References

Living people
1988 births
Argentine female field hockey players
Italian female field hockey players
Female field hockey forwards
Expatriate field hockey players
Italian expatriate sportspeople in Belgium
Italian people of Argentine descent